Shin Hye-sun (born 31 August 1989) is a South Korean actress. She made her debut in the television series School 2013. In 2017, Shin played her first leading role and became well known in the weekend drama, My Golden Life, which garnered more than 8 million viewers. She is also best known for her other leading roles in Korean dramas such as Still 17 (2018), The Hymn of Death (2018), Angel's Last Mission: Love (2019), and Mr. Queen (2020–2021).

She has been lauded by industry insiders for her acting skills, her ability to convey emotions to her audience and her accurate diction, earning her the nickname 'diction fairy', and is being called by insiders as one of the best actresses of her generation.

Career

2012–2016: Career beginnings and minor roles
Shin debuted as an actress through the TV drama School 2013, an installment of the long-running School series, after successfully passing the audition to cast in a schoolgirl role. She played a minor character with the same name as hers.

Shin began to land bigger roles in 2015 with Oh My Ghost and She Was Pretty.
Though both titles were romantic comedies, her characters varied significantly.

2016–2017: Breakthrough
Her breakthrough came in 2016 with Five Enough. Her role as a gullible, naively-romantic woman and her pairing with actor Sung Hoon gained popularity among the viewers. The same year, she starred in the fantasy-romance drama The Legend of the Blue Sea.

In 2017, she played her first lead role in a film in A Day. Shin then played a key figure in an acclaimed crime thriller series Stranger. Soon after, she was cast in her first lead role in a television drama with KBS2's drama My Golden Life. The drama was a major hit in South Korea and surpassed 40% ratings, leading to an increased recognition for Shin. She received a lot of love offers by the advertising industry and producers of movies and dramas.

2018–2019: Artistic characters
In 2018, Shin was cast as a lead in the SBS drama special The Hymn of Death alongside Lee Jong-suk. She played the role of Yun Sim-deok, Korea's first professional soprano singer.

The same year, she starred alongside Yang Se-jong in the SBS romance comedy drama Still 17, as an aspiring violinist whose life turned upside down due to an accident.

In 2019, Shin starred in the KBS2 fantasy romance drama Angel's Last Mission: Love alongside Kim Myung-soo, as a ballerina who has no interest in love.

2020–present: Film debut and rising popularity
In 2020, she was cast to play her first lead role in the legal film Innocence, as a lawyer who decides to defend her mother (Bae Jong-ok) from prosecution. She received positive reviews for her performance in the film and was nominated in the Best New Actress category at the 41st Blue Dragon Film Awards.

In November, she appeared in the caper story film Collectors with Lee Je-hoon, as an art curator Yoon and later in the TVN hit drama Mr. Queen in a dual lead role as both Kim So-yong (Queen Cheorin) as well as Jang Bong-Hwan, a male chef from 2020 whose soul travels back in time and gets trapped in Kim So-yong's body. Shin was nominated for 57th Baeksang Arts Awards in the category Best Actress (TV)  for her performance in Mr. Queen and the branch of Best New Actress (Film) in the  Innocence.

On December 14, 2021, Shin renewed her contract with YNK Entertainment once again.

Philanthropy 
On August 30, 2022, Shin donated  to help those affected by the 2022 South Korean floods through The Neighbors Honors Club.

Filmography

Film

Television series

Television shows

Web shows

Hosting

Music video appearances

Awards and nominations

Notes

References

External links

 Shin Hye-sun at YNK Entertainment 
 
 
 
 

1989 births
Living people
21st-century South Korean actresses
South Korean film actresses
South Korean television actresses
Actresses from Seoul
Sejong University alumni